SPORTBOX is a Mongolian cable television network and Pay television, focusing on sports-related programming including live and recorded event telecasts, and other original programming.

Programming

SCORE NEWS: Daily sports news program delivering the latest sports news and highlights. (Monday - Saturday) 14:00, 19:00
Cycling World:Weekly cycling competition's reviews, latest and most updated news around bike community (every Thursday)
Tennis weekly:ATP and WTA all competition results, review and highlights. (every Tuesday)
4-4-2:Weekly football news and highlights, review. (every Monday and every Friday)
U DRIVE: Motorsport news
MAGIC POOL:Mongolian pool and pocket billiard news and competitions review. 
World of sports:

Official broadcasting

NBA:
Formula One:
FIA Formula E Championship:
IJF - International Judo GranPrix and Grand slam's:

Television companies of Mongolia
National Basketball Association on television
Cable television companies